Susan Mary Hall is a British Conservative Party politician who has been a Member of the London Assembly (AM) for Londonwide since 2017. She has been the leader of the London Conservatives on the Assembly since December 2019.

Political career 
Hall was elected as a Councillor on Harrow London Borough Council for Hatch End Ward in the 2006 local elections. She was given a Cabinet position responsible for the Environment and Community Safety in 2007 and became Deputy Leader of the group in 2008. Hall became Leader of the Conservative group in 2010 and Leader of the Opposition, she took over as Leader of the hung Council in 2013 returning to opposition Leader in 2014. She was appointed to the London Fire and Emergency Planning Authority in June 2010.

At the 2016 London Assembly election, Hall was number 4 on the Conservative Party list. She was not elected.

She inherited the 4th Additional Member seat on the London Assembly in June 2017 following Kemi Badenoch's resignation, as a result of Badenoch's election as MP for Saffron Walden.

In 2018, Hall became deputy leader of the London Conservatives.

After Gareth Bacon was elected to the House of Commons in the 2019 general election, Hall succeeded him as the leader of the Conservatives on the London Assembly.

Hall is a community safety advocate who campaigns for crime prevention. She has called for an increase in police funding in order to tackle knife crime. Hall is a critic of Mayor of London Sadiq Khan.

In March 2020, in response to the coronavirus pandemic in London, Hall wrote a letter to Mayor Khan, asking him to “call in the police” to “enforce the coronavirus lockdown” in order to protect National Health Service workers.

Following the storming of the United States Capitol by supporters of Donald Trump in January 2021, Hall compared the riot to other British politicians' opposition to Brexit.

She was re-elected in the 2021 London Assembly election.

Electoral history

2021 London Assembly election

2016 London Assembly election

References

External links 
 Susan Hall at the London Assembly

Living people
21st-century British women politicians
Conservative Members of the London Assembly
Conservative Party (UK) councillors
People from the London Borough of Harrow
Anti-crime activists
Year of birth missing (living people)
Women councillors in England